Farshid Bagheri is an Iranian football midfielder who currently plays for the Iranian football club Gol Gohar in the Iran Pro League.

Club career

Early years
Bagheri started his career with Mes Kerman from youth levels. As of summer 2012 he joined Etka Gorgan. He was part of Etka Gorgan in promoting to 2014–15 Azadegan League.

Saba Qom
He joined Saba Qom on June 2, 2014 with a 2-year contract. He made his debut against Naft Tehran on November 7, 2014 as a substitute for Hossein Badamaki.

Esteghlal
On 4 June 2016, he joined Esteghlal on a two-year contract.

After 5 seasons in Esteghlal, he left Esteghlal in 2021 and joined Gol Gohar.

Club career statistics

Honours
Esteghlal
Hazfi Cup (1) : 2017–18

References

External links
 Farshid Bagheri  at IranLeague

Living people
Iranian footballers
Sanat Mes Kerman F.C. players
Saba players
Esteghlal F.C. players
1992 births
Etka Gorgan players
Association football defenders
Association football midfielders
People from Kerman